This is a list of chapters of the defunct Sigma Tau (ΣΤ) engineering honor society. Shown for each ΣΤ chapter are: chapter name, college or university (as named in 1974), ΣΤ charter year, campus location and, as applicable, the Tau Beta Pi (ΤΒΠ) chapter that merged with the ΣΤ chapter or the name of the new TBP chapter.  In the 1974 merger of ΣΤ and ΤΒΠ, twelve (12) ΣΤ chapters were absorbed into ΤΒΠ chapters existing on the same campuses.  Twenty-two (22) ΣΤ chapters were re-chartered as new ΤΒΠ Chapters at campuses where ΤΒΠ chapters did not exist.

Notes

See also
 Sigma Tau
 Tau Beta Pi

Lists of chapters of United States student societies by society
 Sigma Tau chapters